Michael Byers is an American writer based in Ann Arbor, Michigan.  He is a graduate of Oberlin College and of the University of Michigan Creative Writing MFA Program.  His first book, The Coast of Good Intentions, is a collection of short stories set in his native Pacific Northwest.  His second book (and first novel), Long for this World, is set in his hometown of Seattle, Washington, and tells the story of a geneticist facing an ethical dilemma that might lead to a cure for a fatal childhood disease.  His third book, Percival's Planet, a novel about the discovery of Pluto in 1930, was published in August 2010.

Byers is an assistant professor in the English Department at the University of Michigan in Ann Arbor.  He is married to the poet Susan Hutton.

Novels
Long for this World (Houghton Mifflin 2003)
Percival's Planet (Henry Holt 2010; published first in the UK as The Unfixed Stars)

Short story collections
The Coast of Good Intentions (Houghton Mifflin 1998)

Honors and awards
 Friends of American Writers Literary Award for Long for this World
 American Academy of Arts and Letters Sue Kaufman Prize for First Fiction for The Coast of Good Intentions
 Whiting Award, 1998
 New York Times Notable Books, 1998 for The Coast of Good Intentions
 PEN/Hemingway Award (finalist) for The Coast of Good Intentions
 Stanford University Stegner Fellowship in Fiction, 1996–98

External links
Author Website
Profile at The Whiting Foundation
Hot Metal Bridge interview with Michael Byers

21st-century American novelists
Living people
Oberlin College alumni
University of Michigan alumni
Writers from Ann Arbor, Michigan
University of Michigan faculty
American male novelists
American male short story writers
21st-century American short story writers
21st-century American male writers
Novelists from Michigan
Year of birth missing (living people)